The Sidi Mohammed ben Abdallah Museum (French: "Musée Sidi Mohammed ben Abdallah") is a history museum in the city of Essaouira, Morocco. It was named after the founder of the city, Mohammed ben Abdallah.

It is located in 19th century mansion, Rue Laâlouj, a central street of the city of Essaouira. 

The museum displays various historical artifacts, including ancient pottery, coins, jewellery, carpets relevant to the history of Essaouira.

References

History museums in Morocco
Essaouira